III is the third studio album by American indie rock band Shiny Toy Guns. It was released on October 22, 2012, by Five Seven Music. The album features the return of the band's original female vocalist, Carah Faye Charnow. The album spawned three singles: "Waiting Alone", "Fading Listening", and "Somewhere to Hide".

Track listing

Personnel
Credits adapted from the liner notes of III.

Shiny Toy Guns
 Carah Faye – vocals, bass, synth ; production 
 Chad Petree – vocals, guitar
 Jeremy Dawson – bass, synth
 Mikey Martin – drums

Additional personnel

 Matty Bernstein – recording 
 Justin Hergett – mixing 
 Daniel Johansson – production 
 Joe LaPorta – mastering
 Emily Lazar – mastering
 Tony Maserati – mixing
 Mirror Machines – engineering, production, programming, recording ; mixing 
 Benjy Russell – cover artwork photography
 Mark Saunders – additional production 
 Ben Schwartz – cover artwork package design
 Chris Tabron – mixing 
 Timothy "Q" Wiles – additional production

Charts

References

2012 albums
Albums produced by Mark Saunders (record producer)
Five Seven Music albums
Shiny Toy Guns albums